is a town located in Ibaraki Prefecture, Japan. The percentage of the population aged over 65 was 34.9%.

Geography
Located in central Ibaraki Prefecture, south of prefectural capital of Mito, Ibaraki is located in the flatlands near the Pacific Ocean, and almost encompasses Lake Hinuma, the 30th largest body of freshwater in Japan.

Surrounding municipalities
Ibaraki Prefecture
 Mito
 Omitama
 Kasama
 Hokota
 Ōarai

Climate
Ibaraki has a humid continental climate (Köppen Cfa) characterized by warm summers and cold winters with light snowfall.  The average annual temperature in Ibaraki is 13.9 °C. The average annual rainfall is 1367 mm with September as the wettest month. The temperatures are highest on average in August, at around 25.7 °C, and lowest in January, at around 3.1 °C.

Demographics
Per Japanese census data, the population of Ibaraki has remained relatively steadily for the past 40 years.

History
The villages of Nagaoka, Kawane, Kaminoai and Ishizaki were created within Higashiibaraki District and the village of Numasaki was created within Kashima District with the establishment of the modern municipalities system on April 1, 1889. Nagaoka was elevated to town status on February 11, 1955 and merged with Kawane and Kaminoai to form the town of Ibaraki the same day. Ibaraki annexed neighboring Ishizaki on March 5, 1958. The town was set to merge with Mito, on December 8, 2007, but following the election of a new mayor in April 2007, these plans were abandoned.

Government
Ibaraki has a mayor-council form of government with a directly elected mayor and a unicameral town council of 16 members. Ibaraki, together with neighboring Hokota and Ōarai, contributes two members to the Ibaraki Prefectural Assembly. In terms of national politics, the town is part of Ibaraki 2nd district of the lower house of the Diet of Japan.

Economy
The economy of Ibaraki is primarily agricultural.

Education
 Ibaraki has four public elementary schools and two public middle schools operated by the town government, and one public high school operated by the Ibaraki Prefectural Board of Education.

Transportation

Railway
 Ibaraki does not have any passenger train service.

Highway
  – Ibarakimachi-Nishi Interchange, Ibarakimachi Junction, Ibarakimachi-Higashi Interchange
  – Ibaraki Kuko Kita Interchange, Ibarakimachi Interchange

Local attractions
 Hinuma Hydrangea Festival
 Ibaraki Festival

Noted people from Ibaraki
Hideaki Tomiyama, Olympic gold medalist in wrestling
 Kami, drummer of Malice Mizer

References

External links

Official Website 

Towns in Ibaraki Prefecture
Ibaraki, Ibaraki